The 2003 FIA GT Barcelona 500 km was the opening round the 2003 FIA GT Championship.  It took place at the Circuit de Catalunya, Spain, on 6 April 2003.

Official results
Class winners in bold.  Cars failing to complete 70% of winner's distance marked as Not Classified (NC).

Statistics
 Pole position – #14 Lister Storm Racing – 1:40.975
 Fastest lap – #1 Larbre Compétition – 1:45.081
 Average speed – 150.790 km/h

References

 
 
 

B
FIA GT